Juan Carlos Castilla Zenobi (Chile 1940) is a marine biologist. He received his PhD from the University of Wales. Since 1965, he has been a faculty member at the Pontificia Universidad Católica de Chile. In 1985, he published a paper on a study which focused on a part of the Chilean coastline from which humans had been excluded. He is a recipient of the 1996 TWAS Prize and the 2011 Ramon Margalef Prize in Ecology.

References 

Chilean marine biologists
Living people
Alumni of the University of Wales
Winners of the Ramon Margalef Prize in Ecology
Academic staff of the Pontifical Catholic University of Chile
TWAS laureates
Fellows of the Ecological Society of America
Foreign associates of the National Academy of Sciences
Year of birth missing (living people)